Oro or ORO, meaning gold in Spanish and Italian, may refer to:

Music and dance
 Oro (dance), a Balkan circle dance
 Oro (eagle dance), an eagle dance from Montenegro and Herzegovina
 "Oro" (song), the Serbian entry in the 2008 Eurovision Song Contest
 ORO, an album by Ufomammut
 Óró – A Live Session, an album by Máire Brennan
 Oro: Grandes Éxitos, an album by ABBA
 Oro album, an RIAA certification for Spanish-language albums

Places 
 Oro, Estonia, a village
 Orø, an island in Denmark
 Örö, a Finnish island northeast of Oskarshamn, Sweden
 4733 ORO, a main-belt asteroid
 Oro City, Colorado, US, a ghost town 
 Oro County, Kansas Territory, a US county from 1859 to 1861
 Oro Moraine, Ontario, Canada, a glacial moraine
 Oro Province, Papua New Guinea
 Oro Bay
 Oro-Medonte or Oro, Ontario, Canada, a township
 Yonggwang County or Oro, North Korea
 Oro concentration camp, a North Korean concentration camp for political prisoners

Sports
 CD Oro, a football club in Jalisco, Mexico
 Oro F.C., a semi-professional association football team from Papua New Guinea

Other uses 
Oro
 Oro (beverage), a Peruvian soft drink
 Oro (grape) or garganega, an Italian wine grape 
 Oro (Street Fighter), a video game character in Street Fighter III
 'Oro, a god in Polynesian mythology
 Oro, a type of tequila
 Oak Ridge Observatory or ORO, an observatory in Harvard, Massachusetts, United States
 Oro languages
 Orokolo language, by ISO 639-3 code

See also 
 El Oro (disambiguation)